Atsuko Seki (born 1964 in Tokyo) is a Japanese pianist.

Biography 
Seki received her education at Musashino School of Music, Tokyo (1983–90). She then continued her education at Music Academy Dortmund. Seki won, ex-aequo with Hideyo Harada, the IV Schubert Competition (1991), and was awarded the IX José Iturbi Competition (1994)'s 3rd prize. She has recorded three CDs.

References

Citations
 Vienna's Schubert Competition
 Divox
 Audiophile Audition

1964 births
Japanese classical pianists
Japanese women pianists
José Iturbi International Piano Competition prize-winners
Living people
Women classical pianists
21st-century classical pianists
21st-century Japanese women musicians
21st-century women pianists